Tillandsia yerba-santae is a species of flowering plant in the genus Tillandsia. This species is endemic to Mexico.

References

yerba-santae
Flora of Mexico